Addition Financial Arena (formerly known as CFE Arena and UCF Arena) is a sports and entertainment arena located in Orlando, Florida, United States, on the main campus of the University of Central Florida. It was constructed beginning in 2006 as a replacement for the original UCF arena, and as a part of Knights Plaza. The arena is home to the UCF Knights men's and women's basketball teams. The arena also hosted the annual Science Olympiad in 2012 and 2014.

As of January 2022, the attendance record for the arena is 10,011, the arena's first and only ever sellout crowd, for a March 22, 2017 NIT Quarterfinals matchup with the Illinois Fighting Illini. The theater can be configured for concerts, family events, musical theatre, commencements, and other stage shows and sporting events. Local high schools often host graduations at the arena. One of UCF's biggest event, Knight-Thon, is also held at the arena. The fundraiser is a dance marathon which raises money for Children's Miracle Network. The Addition Financial Arena is owned by the university, and is managed by Oak View Group.

Original arena

The arena was originally built in 1991 with a capacity of 5,100 and was home to men's basketball, women's basketball, and volleyball, and was also used for events such as concerts and commencements. It has hosted the Atlantic Sun Conference men's basketball tournament three times, in 1994, 1995, and 2002. The last basketball game played in the original facility was on March 3, 2007, when the UCF men's team beat the East Carolina Pirates, 77–64, in Conference USA play.

While basketball moved into the new arena, the men's and women's volleyball teams continue to play their regular-season games at the Venue.

History

A new arena was built 2007, as part of a larger project to create an athletic village known as Knights Plaza. The new arena, built in the space in front of the original arena, is double the seating capacity of its predecessor, including 7,479 fixed standard seats, 500 club seats, 1,328 retractable seats, 188 disabled seats, 16 luxury suites (seating capacity 192, total capacity 256), two party suites (total capacity 60) and loge box seating for 64. According to the promoters' guide, the new arena has a basketball capacity of 9,465, and can hold up to 10,072 for concert events. The student section has been dubbed the "Knightmare."

The new arena was completed in September 2007 and is the home to both the men's and women's basketball teams. This expansion made the Addition Financial Arena the second largest arena complex in Orlando. Beginning in 2008, the grounds around arena hosted "Light Up UCF", a holiday celebration that features an outdoor ice skating rink.  For the event, the arena is decorated with thousands of lights that are synchronized to holiday music.

In October 2008, the Addition Financial Arena was home to one of the largest Presidential Debate Watch Parties ever. On the front lawn of the arena the Presidential Debate was projected onto a large inflatable movie screen while a Lupe Fiasco concert was taking place inside the arena. The Presidential Debate, which was the final debate of the election, was then replayed for the thousands of attendees as they were leaving the concert. Lupe Fiasco actually acknowledged that the debate would be shown after the show and encouraged the attendees to stay and watch it because of the significance of the election.

In 2010, the Legends Football League team Orlando Fantasy played at the arena. In 2014, it served as the home of the Orlando Predators of the Arena Football League.

On May 18–19, 2012, the arena hosted the Opening and Closing Ceremonies of the 2012 Science Olympiad National Tournament.

In addition to its use as a basketball arena, the arena is regularly used to host other events on campus, including career fairs, graduation ceremonies, concerts, and public speakers. Addition Financial Arena has increasingly been used in recent years as an alternative to the much larger Amway Center in downtown Orlando.

Professional wrestling promotion All Elite Wrestling held an episode of their weekly television show AEW Dynamite at the arena on October 23, 2021. AEW would return to the arena to hold three shows in a three day span, March 4, 2022 to March 6, 2022. AEW held an episode of their other weekly show AEW Rampage, a fan fest, and then their PPV AEW  Revolution

Naming
UCF expressed interest numerous times in selling the naming rights to the arena. At one point, AirTran Airways was in negotiations to purchase naming rights, but no agreement was ever reached. On May 22, 2013, the UCF Board of Trustees officially announced that the school had entered into a naming rights contract with CFE Federal Credit Union, which has had a long-standing history with UCF. The deal was slated for seven years and was worth $3.95 million, or $564,285.72 per year. The new name took effect on May 23, 2013.

On May 1, 2019, CFE changed its name to Addition Financial and, coinciding with the change, the arena's name changed from CFE Arena to Addition Financial Arena on the same date. The arena's naming rights deal was not affected by the sponsor's name change.

On August 18, 2022, UCF announced that Addition Financial had extended their naming rights for the facility through 2034. The 12-year extension is worth $20 million.

Events
The arena holds different types of events every year. In 2013, the arena hosted 356 events and served 394,121 attendees. It ranked fifth in university venues in the U.S. in 2014 in terms of gross ticket sales and attendance.

Entertainment

Addition Financial Arena has hosted concerts by high-profile musicians such as Lady Gaga, Katy Perry, Elton John, Drake and more. The arena also served as the venue for the University of Central Florida's series of annual entertainment events for their students like the Homecoming Concert Knight, Comedy Knight, KnightFest or Pegasus Palooza.

See also

 Greater Orlando
 List of NCAA Division I basketball arenas

References

External links

UCF Athletics Athletics website
University of Central Florida School website
Satellite view from Google Maps

College basketball venues in the United States
UCF Knights basketball
Sports venues in Orlando, Florida
Music venues in Orlando, Florida
Sports venues completed in 2007
Music venues in Florida
Basketball venues in Florida
2007 establishments in Florida
Indoor arenas in Florida
Populous (company) buildings